Girlschool Live was the first official live album by British heavy metal band, Girlschool, released on Communiqué Records in 1995. It again features Kelly Johnson on lead guitar.

Track listing

Credits
Kim McAulliffe – vocals, guitar
Kelly Johnson – vocals, guitar
Tracey Lamb – bass
Denise Dufort – drums

References

External links
Official Girlschool discography

Girlschool live albums
1995 live albums